Sighnaghi is an administrative-territorial unit in eastern Georgia, Kakheti region. The municipality borders the municipalities of Gurjaani and Sagarejo to the northwest and west, the municipality of Dedoplistskaro to the southeast and the municipality of Lagodekhi and the Republic of Azerbaijan to the north and northeast. The area is 1251.7 km². Agricultural fields occupy 93,375 ha, and forest resources amount to 5,500 ha.

History 
Until 1917, Sighnaghi municipality was called Sighnaghi Mazra; from 1928, the municipality was part of Kakheti Mazra, and from 1929 it was included in Kakheti District. Since 1930, it has been formed as a separate district. On July 9, 1938, according to the resolution of the Supreme Council of the Georgian SSR, the Sighnaghi district was separated from Tsiteltskaro district, and the remaining district was divided into the following rural councils: Sighnaghi (district centre), Anaga, Vakiri, Sakobo, Bodbis-Khevi, Kvemo-Machkhaani, Jugaani, Tibaani, Nukriani, Magharo, Bodbe and Ulyanovka. From 1963-1964, Tsiteltskaro district again joined to Sighnaghi district, and from 1965 it was again separated as a separate unit of Dedoplistskaro district.

Based on then-President Mikheil Saakashvili's Order No. 2304 of December 16, 2005, the districts of Georgia were reorganized, resulting from which the existing districts were changed into municipalities. LEPL Sighnaghi Municipality was registered as a payer (ID 240417223) is December 21, 2006, and the date of registration was June 18, 2007.

Sighnaghi is a municipality located in the Kakheti region. It is determined by archeological excavations that this area played an important role since the Paleolithic, Neolithic and Bronze Ages. The territory of Sighnaghi district was formerly known as Kambechovani, and later it was called Kiziki. After the recognition of Christianity as the state religion in Georgia, this side acquired great importance. St. Nino was executed and buried here. Sighnaghi is a word of Turkish origin and means shelter.

Administrative divisions and sattlements 
Municipality of Sighnaghi is a unification of settlements with administrative borders and an administrative centre - the city of Sighnaghi. Sighnaghi municipality has an elected representative body (council) and an executive body (town hall). The municipality has a registered population and its own property, budget, and income. The municipality is a legal entity under public law. The municipality council and mayor of Sighnaghi municipality are elected for four years. The last elections were held in 2021.

Settlements

The municipality is divided into the independent cities of Sighnaghi and Tsnori as well as 12 municipalities (Georgian temi, თემი or simply "village", Georgian sopeli, სოფელი):

 Vaqiri 
 Bodbe
 Sakobo
 Kvemo Machkhani 
 Jugaani
 Anaga 
 Bodbiskhevi
 Iliatsminda
 Magharo 
 Nukriani 
 Tibaani 
 Old Anaga

Geography and climate
Sighnaghi Municipality is located in Eastern Georgia, in the Kakheti region. Its administrative center is the city of Sighnaghi. The municipality is bordered by Gurjaani Municipality and Sagarejo Municipality municipalities to the northwest and west, Dedoplistskaro Municipality to the southeast, Lagodekhi Municipality to the north and northeast, and the Republic of Azerbaijan. A large part of Sighnaghi municipality is occupied by the Iori Plateau. A small part of Gombori ridge also enters its territory. The highest mountain in the Gombori ridge within the municipality is Choporti (1087 m).

Sighnaghi lacks a hydrographic network. There are mostly periodic rivers here. We must distinguish two rivers, the Alazani and the Iori. Thorn bushes are spread on Iori highland. In the southern part of the Iori Plateau, we find the bush saltwort, from which soda is extracted. There are floodplain forests along the banks of the river Iori: Tsnori, floodplain poplar, Ialghuni, etc. Oak and hornbeam are noteworthy in the forests of Gombori ridge. There are several types of climate in the territory of Sighnaghi municipality. The Iori plateau has a moderately humid steppe climate, with hot summers and cold winters. The Alazani plain has a moderately humid climate, where the winters are moderately cold and the summers are hot. The Gombori ridge has a moderately humid and moderately warm climate with cold winters and long warm summers.

Politics 

Sighnaghi Municipal Assembly (Georgian: სიღნაღის საკრებულო) is a representative body in Sighnaghi Municipality. currently consisting of 27 members. The council is assembled into session regularly, to consider subject matters such as code changes, utilities, taxes, city budget, oversight of city government and more. Sighnaghi sakrebulo is elected every four years. The last election was held in October 2017.

Education 
Twenty public schools are operating in the territory of Sighnaghi municipality, and one of the mentioned schools is located in the territory of Sighnaghi city. 3 non-state (private) educational institutions operate in the territory of the municipality. Among them - 2 are located in the city of Sighnaghi: "Intellecti" LLC and "Etaloni 2015" LLC. Third - "Progressi 010" LLC is located in the village of Sakobo.

There are also 24 preschools (kindergartens) educational institutions operating in the territory of Sighnaghi municipality.

Culture 
There is a theatre operating in the city of Sighnaghi; its history dates back to 1872.

NNLE Culture and Art centre has been created in the municipality, where 13 municipal culture centres are united.

Twenty libraries operate in the municipality, including children's libraries.

A historical-ethnographic museum functions in the city of Sighnaghi.

The house museum of Vano Sarajishvili operates in Sighnaghi city.

One can visit the memorial museum of the self-taught artist and composer Sandro Mirianashvili in the city of Sighnaghi. The museum was opened in 1998.

The museum of Sandro Akhmeteli, one of the founders of modern Georgian theatre, is operating in the village of Anaga. The director's memorial items, existing ethnographic material, and works of fine art are preserved in the museum.

The house museum of the Georgian writer Irodion Evdoshvili operates in the village of Bodbishkhevi. Memorial items of the writer and existing ethnographic material are preserved in the museum, including paintings, photographs and documentary material, and collections from different periods.

The house-museum of the national hero of Italy Pore Mosulishvili, is open for visitors in the village of Kvemo Machkhaani. One can see Pore Mosulishvili's memorial items, medals, orders, albums, ethnographic items, photos, documents and others in the museum.

The house museum of the Georgian writer and dramatist Sandro Shanshiashvili operates in the village of Jugaani. The museum preserves his personal belongings, historical and ethnographic material, including a piano donated by Zakaria Paliashvili, and material depicting the poet's life and work.

The memorial museum of the famous Georgian actor Vaso Godziashvili is inviting visitors to the village of Vakiri. Vaso Godziashvili's memorial items, historical and ethnographic material, works of fine art, documentary and photo material, costumes for plays, books about the actor's life and work, theatrical sketches, and models are preserved in the museum.

The house museum of the famous Georgian scientist, professor, surgeon and urologist Alexander Gzirishvili operates in the village of Vakiri. His personal belongings, ethnographic material, photographs and documentary material depicting the scientist's life and work are preserved in the museum.

There is the memorial museum of the Georgian writer, poet and dramatist Ilo Mosashvili in the village of Vakiri. The museum preserves Ilo Mosashvili's memorial items, historical and ethnographic material, and photo and documentary material depicting the life and work of the writer.

Festivals and public holidays

Sport 
There are 22 sports sections operating in Sighnaghi municipality: football, wrestling-judo, Georgian wrestling, Greco-Roman wrestling, power triathlon, boxing, kickboxing, basketball, rugby, chess. There are 4 sports sections in the city of Sighnaghi: football, chess, boxing, power triathlon, and 18 sections operate in the territory of the rest of municipality.

Economy 
The main part of the population is employed in agriculture. Viticulture, animal husbandry, poultry farming, etc. are developed in the municipality.

There are several wineries. Agricultural fields occupy 90 thousand ha, of which 40 thousand ha are arable and 50 thousand ha are pastures

Tourism and historical sites

Nature
 Iori Managed Reserve
 Kilakupra mud volcanoes

Cultural monuments
 Bodbe Monastery
 Khirsa Monastery
 Sabereebi
 Church of St. John the Baptist in Vaqiri

Notable people

Twin towns – sister Municipalities 
 Khadrak (Spain)
 Malbork (Poland)
 Chateauneuf (France)
 Greiz (Germany)
 Ortahisar (Turkey)

See also 
 List of municipalities in Georgia (country)

References

External links 
 Districts of Georgia, Statoids.com

Municipalities of Kakheti